Christian Gratzei (born 19 September 1981 in Leoben) is an Austrian footballer currently playing as a goalkeeper.

Career

DSV Leoben
Gratzei joined the Leoben youth academy in 1987, at the age of six. He spent 11 years in the youth ranks before finally being promoted to the senior squad in 1998.

Grazer AK
On 1 July 2001, Gratzei was sold to Grazer AK. He spent his entire time at Grazer playing with the second team.

Sturm Graz
On 1 July 2002, Gratzei moved to SK Sturm Graz.

Honors
SK Sturm Graz
Austrian Football Bundesliga: 2010-11
Austrian Cup: 2009-10

References

External links
 
 
 

1981 births
Living people
Austrian footballers
SK Sturm Graz players
DSV Leoben players
Grazer AK players
Association football goalkeepers
Austria international footballers
2. Liga (Austria) players
Austrian Football Bundesliga players